"In This Home on Ice" is a song by Brooklyn-based indie rock band Clap Your Hands Say Yeah, from their eponymous debut album. The song was released as a single in the United Kingdom by Wichita Recordings on February 27, 2006. The single was backed with another track from the eponymous album, "Gimmie Some Salt", and a non-album track, "Cigarettes." The single reached #68 on the UK Singles Chart.

Track listing

CD single
 "In This Home on Ice" – 3:58
 "Gimmie Some Salt" (BBC 6Music Gideon Coe Session) – 3:03
 "Cigarettes" (BBC 6Music Gideon Coe Session) – 3:10

7" single
 "In This Home on Ice"
 "Upon This Tidal Wave of Young Blood" (BBC 6Music Gideon Coe Session)

References

2006 singles
Clap Your Hands Say Yeah songs
2005 songs
Wichita Recordings singles